Maresquel-Ecquemicourt is a commune in the Pas-de-Calais department in the Hauts-de-France region of France.

Geography
Maresquel-Ecquemicourt is situated 8 miles (13 km) southeast of Montreuil-sur-Mer, on the D349 road.

Population

Places of interest
 The church of Saint-Pierre, dating from the seventeenth century.

See also
Communes of the Pas-de-Calais department

References

Maresquelecquemicourt